Marho Kotri Wildlife Sanctuary is located on Arabian Sea coast along Indus River Delta in Thatta District, Sindh, Pakistan.

External links
 Conservation and Hunting Association of Pakistan (CHAP)

References

Wildlife sanctuaries of Pakistan
Natural history of Sindh
Protected areas of Sindh